Taveuni Ofisa (born 14 July 1964) is a Samoan former weightlifter. He competed in the men's lightweight event at the 1988 Summer Olympics.

References

External links
 

1964 births
Living people
Samoan male weightlifters
Olympic weightlifters of Samoa
Weightlifters at the 1988 Summer Olympics
Place of birth missing (living people)
20th-century Samoan people
21st-century Samoan people